Piaseczno  (formerly German Neuendorf) is a village in the administrative district of Gmina Banie, within Gryfino County, West Pomeranian Voivodeship, in north-western Poland.

For the history of the region, see History of Pomerania.

The village has a population of 410.

References 

Villages in Gryfino County